During the 2008–09 English football season, West Bromwich Albion competed in the Premier League, following promotion from the Football League Championship as Football League champions the previous season.

Season summary
West Bromwich began the season strongly with ten points from their opening seven games leaving them in midtable, but that proved to be as good as it got for the Midlanders and with only five more league wins during the rest of the season Albion soon sunk to the foot of the Premier League and were relegated in last place. At the end of the season, manager Tony Mowbray left to take charge at Celtic; he was replaced by MK Dons manager Roberto Di Matteo.

In January, an assessment of company accounts by Equifax saw Albion rated third among Premiership clubs by credit rating, with a score of 71 out of 100.

Final league table

Background
West Bromwich retained their kit sponsorship deal with English company Umbro, who introduced both a new home kit and a new away kit with navy shorts and yellow shirts and socks. The club was unable to find a kit sponsor for the season, and so became the first club in Premier League history to go a season without any kit sponsorship.

Albion completed a £3 million-plus refurbishment of the Halfords Lane Stand in time for the start of the season. This included new dressing rooms, dugout areas and tunnel, executive boxes and a media gantry. As a result, the capacity of The Hawthorns was slightly reduced to 26,272 and the stand was renamed as the West Stand. New navy blue seats were installed in the stand, replacing the lighter blue seats previously fitted.

Players

First-team squad

Left club during season

Reserve squad

Statistics

Appearances and goals

|-
! colspan=14 style=background:#dcdcdc; text-align:center| Goalkeepers

|-
! colspan=14 style=background:#dcdcdc; text-align:center| Defenders

|-
! colspan=14 style=background:#dcdcdc; text-align:center| Midfielders

|-
! colspan=14 style=background:#dcdcdc; text-align:center| Forwards

|-
! colspan=14 style=background:#dcdcdc; text-align:center| Players transferred out during the season

|}

Results
West Bromwich Albion's score comes first

League Cup

FA Cup

Premier League

Notes

References

West Bromwich Albion F.C. seasons
West